The 1949 Ball State Cardinals football team was an American football team that represented Ball State Teachers College (later renamed Ball State University) as an independent during the 1949 college football season. In their 14th season under head coach John Magnabosco, the Cardinals compiled an 8–0 record and outscored opponents by a total of 276 to 61.

Schedule

References

Ball State
Ball State Cardinals football seasons
College football undefeated seasons
Ball State Cardinals football